Hearts and Masks is a 1921 American silent comedy film directed by William A. Seiter and starring Elinor Field, Francis McDonald and Lloyd Bacon.

Cast
 Elinor Field as Alice Gaynor
 Francis McDonald as Galloping Dick
 Lloyd Bacon as Richard Comstock
 John Cossar as John Gaynor
 Mollie McConnell as Mrs. Graves

References

Bibliography
 Munden, Kenneth White. The American Film Institute Catalog of Motion Pictures Produced in the United States, Part 1. University of California Press, 1997.

External links
 

1921 films
1921 comedy films
1920s English-language films
American silent feature films
Silent American comedy films
American black-and-white films
Films directed by William A. Seiter
Film Booking Offices of America films
1920s American films